Morrisania Hospital was a four-structure full service hospital with an 11-story main building that was built in 1926 and closed in 1976.

History

The hospital, which had a separate structure for laundry, opened in 1929 as a 400-bed facility, three years after it was built. By the time it closed, Morrisania was described as a 311-bed facility.

"After more than 20 years of sitting empty" the hospital's structure was converted to an apartment building.

References

  

Defunct hospitals in the Bronx
History of the Bronx